Jay Warwick is a former United States Olympian in taekwondo. Warwick won bronze medals in the 1988 Seoul Olympics and 1987 
Barcelona World Championships, gold at the 1986 Pan Am Championships and silver in 1982, bronze at the 1987 Pan Am Games and 8 national titles.  In 1999, he became executive director of the United States Taekwondo Union then Director of Sport Partnerships with the United States Olympic Committee in 2003 and in 2018 became Secretary General of USA Taekwondo. Outside sports, he had a long career as a restaurateur.

References

American male taekwondo practitioners
Olympic taekwondo practitioners of the United States
Living people
Taekwondo practitioners at the 1988 Summer Olympics
Pan American Games medalists in taekwondo
Pan American Games bronze medalists for the United States
Taekwondo practitioners at the 1987 Pan American Games
Medalists at the 1987 Pan American Games
World Taekwondo Championships medalists
1957 births